Høybakken is a village in the municipality of Ørland in Trøndelag county, Norway. The area was once part of the municipality of Stjørna. The village is home to the Hegvik Church.

References

Villages in Trøndelag
Ørland